Justice Prashant Mishra (born 29 August 1964) is an Indian judge. He is currently serving as the Chief Justice of Andhra Pradesh High Court. He is former Acting Chief Justice of Chhattisgarh High Court. He has also served as Judge of the Chhattisgarh High Court.

See also
List of current Indian chief justices
List of Chief Justices of India

References

Chief justices of India
Living people
1964 births
People from Raigarh